A passenger station was opened at Par on 20 June 1876 when the Cornwall Minerals Railway started a passenger service from Fowey to Newquay. It was adjacent to the railway's workshops. Although the station was built to serve Par, the entrance was on the west side of the town and close to the adjacent town of St Blazey.

On 1 January 1879 a loop line was built to the Cornwall Railway station at Par and the Cornwall Minerals Railway station renamed St Blazey to avoid the confusion of two stations with the same name.

St Blazey station closed to the public on 21 September 1925 but continued to be used by workmen's trains to Fowey until 29 December 1934.

Goods traffic is still sometimes loaded in the goods yard at St Blazey, which is otherwise used for storing wagons from the adjacent marshalling yard.

References

Disused railway stations in Cornwall
Former Great Western Railway stations
Railway stations in Great Britain opened in 1876
Railway stations in Great Britain closed in 1934
St Blazey